Acridoidea is the largest superfamily of grasshoppers in the order Orthoptera with species found on every continent except Antarctica.

Classification
Orthoptera Species File includes the following families:
Acrididae MacLeay, 1821
Dericorythidae Jacobson & Bianchi, 1905
Lathiceridae Dirsh, 1954
Lentulidae Dirsh, 1956
Lithidiidae Dirsh, 1961
Ommexechidae Bolívar, 1884
Pamphagidae Burmeister, 1840
Pamphagodidae Bolívar, 1884
Pyrgacrididae Kevan, 1974
Romaleidae Pictet & Saussure, 1887
Tristiridae Rehn, 1906

Chromosomes
Among the families Acrididae, Ommexechidae and Romaleidae there is reported to be chromosomal stability with a high frequency of species harbouring diploid number (2n) of 23♂/24♀ chromosomes. In species of Acrididae and Romaleidae it is common to have acrocentric chromosomes with a fundamental number (FN), i.e. number of chromosome arms, of 23♂/24♀. However, chromosomal rearrangements are frequently found as deviations from the standard acrocentric karyotype. In the subfamily Ommexechinae most species show a unique karyotype (2n = 23♂/24♀, FN = 25♂/26♀) due to the occurrence of a large autosomal pair (L1) with submetacentric morphology. There is some support for 'Mesa's hypothesis' of an ancestral pericentric inversion in the ancestor of Ommexechinae to explain this karyotype variation.

References

Caelifera
Insect superfamilies
Taxa named by William Sharp Macleay